Burger Time is a regional chain of drive-through fast food restaurants that is headquartered in West Fargo, North Dakota. Its original restaurant was founded in Fargo, North Dakota in 1987, and it currently has nine locations in North Dakota, Minnesota, and South Dakota.

History
Burger Time's first location opened in Fargo, North Dakota, in August 1987, and it quickly opened more locations upon its initial success. The company was initially privately owned. Doug Geeslin, a Fargo-based investor, purchased the company from its founder. In 2004  Sterion, a medical devices company later renamed Sten Corporation, purchased Burger Time from Geeslin. Sten was controlled by Gary Copperud, president of CMM Properties, and CEO Kenneth Brimmer, a former president of Rainforest Cafe. On April 29, 2007, Sten sold Burger Time to BTND LLC, a Colorado limited liability company owned by Copperud and Jeffrey A. Zinnecker and accepted all liabilities. The duo resigned from Sten's board of directors.

Types
Burger Time primarily operates outdoor restaurants which offer only drive-through or walk up service. There is typically an outdoor seating area available as well as extra parking for customers who wish to eat in their vehicles.

Products
The company's menu includes hamburgers, french fries, soft drinks, and other typical fast food fare, sold in combinations or a la carte. Their signature item is the "Bigger Burger", a 1/3 pound flame broiled burger. Burger Time also purveys barbecue pulled pork and chicken sandwiches as well as apple pie. The "Bigger Burger" combo accounts for 80% of a typical location's sales.

See also
 List of hamburger restaurants

References

External links
Official website

West Fargo, North Dakota
Companies based in Fargo–Moorhead
Restaurants in North Dakota
Economy of the Midwestern United States
Regional restaurant chains in the United States
Fast-food chains of the United States
Fast-food hamburger restaurants
Restaurants established in 1987
1987 establishments in North Dakota